The history of USDA nutrition guidelines includes over 100 years of nutrition advice promulgated by the USDA (United States Department of Agriculture).  The guidelines have been updated over time, to adopt new scientific findings and new public health marketing techniques. The current guidelines are the Dietary Guidelines for Americans 2015–2020. been criticized as not accurately representing scientific information about optimal nutrition, and as being overly influenced by the agricultural industries the USDA promotes.

Earliest guides 
The USDA's first nutrition guidelines were published in 1894 by Dr. Wilbur Olin Atwater as a farmers' bulletin. In Atwater's 1904 publication titled Principles of Nutrition and Nutritive Value of Food, he advocated variety, proportionality and moderation; measuring calories; and an efficient, affordable diet that focused on nutrient-rich foods and less fat, sugar and starch. This information preceded the discovery of individual vitamins beginning in 1910.

A new guide in 1916, Food for Young Children by nutritionist Caroline Hunt, categorized foods into milk and meat; cereals; vegetables and fruits; fats and fatty foods; and sugars and sugary foods. How to Select Food in 1917 promoted these five food groups to adults, and the guidelines remained in place through the 1920s. In 1933, the USDA introduced food plans at four different cost levels in response to the Great Depression.

In 1941, the first Recommended Dietary Allowances were created, listing specific intakes for calories, protein, iron, calcium, and vitamins A, B1, B2 B3, C and D.

Basic 7 

In 1943, during World War II, the USDA introduced a nutrition guide promoting the "Basic 7" food groups to help maintain nutritional standards under wartime food rationing. The Basic 7 food groups were:

 Green and yellow vegetables (some raw; some cooked, frozen or canned)
 Oranges, tomatoes, grapefruit (or raw cabbage or salad greens)
 Potatoes and other vegetables and fruits (raw, dried, cooked, frozen or canned)
 Milk and milk products (fluid, evaporated, dried milk, or cheese)
 Meat, poultry, fish, or eggs (or dried beans, peas, nuts, or peanut butter)
 Bread, flour, and cereals (natural whole grain, or enriched or restored)
 Butter and fortified margarine (with added Vitamin A)

Basic Four 
From 1956 until 1992 the United States Department of Agriculture recommended its "Basic Four" food groups. These food groups were:

 milk
 meat 
 fruit and vegetables 
 bread and cereals

"Other foods" were said to round out meals and satisfy appetites. These included additional servings from the Basic Four, or foods such as butter, margarine, salad dressing and cooking oil, sauces, jellies and syrups.

The Basic Four guide was omnipresent in nutrition education in the United States. A notable example is the 1972 series Mulligan Stew, providing nutrition education for schoolchildren in reruns until 1981.

Food Guide Pyramid 

The introduction of the USDA's food guide pyramid in 1992 attempted to express the recommended servings of each food group, which previous guides did not do. 6 to 11 servings of bread, cereal, rice and pasta occupied the large base of the pyramid; followed by 3 to 5 servings of vegetables; then fruits (2 to 4); then milk, yogurt and cheese (2 to 3); followed by meat, poultry, fish, dry beans, eggs, and nuts (2 to 3); and finally fats, oils and sweets in the small apex (to be used sparingly). Inside each group were several images of representative foods, as well as symbols representing the fat and sugar contents of the foods.

A modified food pyramid was proposed for adults aged over 70.  This "Modified Food Pyramid for 70+ Adults" accounted for changing diets with age by emphasizing water consumption as well as nutrient-dense and high-fiber foods.

MyPyramid 

In 2005, the USDA updated its guide with MyPyramid, which replaced the hierarchical levels of the Food Guide Pyramid with colorful vertical wedges, often displayed without images of foods, creating a more abstract design. Stairs were added up the left side of the pyramid with an image of a climber to represent a push for exercise. The share of the pyramid allotted to grains now only narrowly edged out vegetables and milk, which were of equal proportions. Fruits were next in size, followed by a narrower wedge for protein and a small sliver for oils. An unmarked white tip represented discretionary calories for items such as candy, alcohol, or additional food from any other group.

MyPlate

MyPlate is the current nutrition guide published by the United States Department of Agriculture, consisting of a diagram of a plate and glass divided into five food groups. It replaced the USDA's MyPyramid diagram on June 2, 2011, ending 19 years of food pyramid iconography. The diagram shows a plate divided into four wedges, with the two slightly larger ones representing vegetables and grains and the two slightly smaller ones representing protein and fruits, and with a circle adjacent to represent dairy (e.g. a glass of milk). The guide is displayed on food packaging and used in nutritional education in the United States.

Dietary Guidelines

The Center for Nutrition Policy and Promotion in the USDA and the United States Department of Health and Human Services jointly released a longer textual document called Dietary Guidelines for Americans 2015 - 2020, to be updated in 2020.  The first edition was published in 1980, and since 1985 has been updated every five years by the Dietary Guidelines Advisory Committee.  Like the USDA Food Pyramid, these guidelines have been criticized as being overly influenced by the agriculture industry.
These criticisms of the Dietary Guidelines arose due to the omission of high-quality evidence that the Public Health Service decided to exclude. The phrasing of recommendations was extremely important and widely affected everyone who read it. The wording had to be changed constantly as there were protests due to comments such as "cut down on fatty meats", which led to the U.S Department of Agriculture having to stop the publication of the USDA Food Book. Slight alterations of various dietary guidelines had to be made throughout the 1970s and 1980s in an attempt to calm down the protests emerged. As a compromise, the phrase was changed to "choose lean meat" but did not result in a better situation. In 2015 the committee factored in environmental sustainability for the first time in its recommendations. The committee's 2015 report found that a healthy diet should comprise higher plant based foods and lower animal based foods. It also found that a plant food based diet was better for the environment than one based on meat and dairy.

In 2013 and again in 2015, Edward Archer and colleagues published a series of research articles in PlosOne and Mayo Clinic Proceedings demonstrating that the dietary data used to develop the US Dietary Guidelines were physiologically implausible (i.e., incompatible with survival) and therefore these data were "inadmissible" as scientific evidence and should not be used to inform public policy.

The 2020–2025 guidelines were to be released in Spring 2020.

See also
List of nutrition guides
5 A Day
 Fruits & Veggies – More Matters
Nutrition facts label

References

Nutrition guides
United States Department of Agriculture
Publications of the United States government